Meru Betiri National Park is a national park in the province of East Java, Indonesia, extending over an area of 580 km2 of which a small part is marine (8.45 km2). The beaches of the park provide nesting grounds for endangered turtle species such as leatherback turtles, hawksbill turtles, green turtles, and olive ridley turtles.

Geography and climate
Meru Betiri National Park has a varied topography reaching from a plain coast to highlands with an altitude of almost . The tallest mountains within the park are Mount Gamping (538 m), Mount Butak (609 m), Mount Sukamade Atas (801 m), Mount Gendong (840 m asl), Mount Mandilis (844 m) and Mount Betiri (1,192 m). The topography along the coast is generally hilly to mountainous. There are only few sandy plain coasts, most of them located in the west, such as Rajegwesi Beach, Sukamade Beach, Permisan Beach, Meru Beach and Bandealit Beach. Some rivers across Meru Betiri NP are Sukamade River, a perennial river, Permisan River, Meru River and Sekar Pisang River that flow to the South coast.

The Meru Betiri area is influenced by monsoon wind. During November to March, the westerly wind brings rainfall to the area, whereas the dry season occurs during April to October.

Vegetation

As a result of its diverse topography, Meru Betiri NP contains five distinct vegetation types:
 Coastal vegetation, found around Sukamade Bay and Meru Bay. This vegetation includes the Barringtonia asiatica, Calophyllum inophyllum, Hibiscus tiliaceus, Terminalia catappa, and Pandanus tectorius.
 Mangrove vegetation, found at the eastern side of the Rajegwesi Bay as the outlet of Lembu and Karang Tambak Rivers, Meru Bay and Sukamade Coast. The dominant vegetations are Rhizophora, Avicennia and Bruguiera. At the outlet of the Sukamade River, there is Nypa fruticans.
 Swamp vegetation, found at the back of the mangrove forest of Sukamade. Some tree species here are Manilkara kauki, Gluta renghas, Alstonia scholaris, and Sterculia foetida.
 Lowland tropical rain forest, including among others tree species of Pterospermum, Tetrameles nudiflora, Ficus variegata, Diospyros cauliflora, Aglaia variegata, Dracontomelon mangiferum, Bischofia javanica, Dysoxylum gaudichaudianum, Pseudobombax septenatum, Litsea, and Plectocomia elongata.
 Rheophytic vegetation, found in the wetland areas, such as at the Sukamade area. The dominant vegetation species here is the Saccharum spontaneum.

The rare parasitic plant Rafflesia zollingeriana was rediscovered in Meru Betiri NP.

Fauna
The park provides habitat for many other protected animals, including 29 species of mammal and 180 species of bird. Among them are the banteng, Javan leopard, wild boar, long-tailed macaque, Sumatran dhole, Javanese flying squirrel, leopard cat, Javan muntjac, and green peafowl. The beaches of the park provide nesting ground for leatherback turtles, hawksbill turtles, green turtles, and olive ridley turtles.

Meru Betiri National Park is known as the last habitat of the Javan tiger (Panthera tigris sondaica) which is now considered extinct, with the last sighting having been recorded in 1976.
Due to a research in 1997 found a tiger paw prints at size , so the Forestry Ministry has agreed to monitor the existence of the Javanese tiger by camera trap in 2011.

Conservation
The Meru Betiri Forest area was first appointed as a protected forest by the Dutch Colonial Government in 1931. In 1972 the Meru Betiri Protected Forest (500 km2) was appointed as a wildlife sanctuary, prioritized for protecting the habitat of the then endangered Javan tiger. In 1982 the sanctuary was expanded to its current extent of 580 km2 including a marine area of 845 ha. In 1982 the sanctuary was declared a National Park, which finally has been designated as such in 1997.

References

External links
Meru Betiri National Park Management Authority

National parks of Indonesia
Geography of East Java
Tourist attractions in East Java